Loi is a surname. It has various origins, including as a spelling of three Chinese surnames, a traditional surname from Sardinia, and a surname in India from the word loi meaning "scheduled caste" in the Meitei language.

Origins
Loi may be the spelling of three Chinese surnames, based on their pronunciation in different varieties of Chinese; they are listed below by their spelling in Hanyu Pinyin, which reflects the Mandarin Chinese pronunciation:
Léi, meaning "thunder"; the spelling Loi is based on the Cantonese pronunciation. The spelling Loi is common in Macau, while other spellings of the same surname such as Lui and Louie are found in Hong Kong and among overseas Chinese.
Lǚ; nearly-homophonous with the above in Cantonese (note the differing tone), and so also spelled Loi, Lui, or Louie.
Lí, a fossil word meaning "black" or "brown". The spelling Loi is based on the pronunciation in various dialects of Southern Min

The Chinese surname meaning "thunder" is spelled in Vietnamese as Lôi (that being the Sino-Vietnamese pronunciation of the original Chinese character).

Loi is also a surname found in Manipur, India, from the word loi meaning "scheduled caste" in the Meitei language.

As an Italian surname, Loi appears to have originated as a shortened form of some given name, possibly the Sardinian Balloe, or the Sicilian Aloi (the local form of the name Eligio).

Loi may also be a Greek surname.

Statistics
In Italy, 2,716 families bore the surname Loi, with the great majority of them (2,061, 76%) located in Sardinia, and only 10 (0.5%) located in Sicily.
 
According to statistics cited by Patrick Hanks, there were 282 people on the island of Great Britain and one on the island of Ireland with the surname Loi as of 2011. There was one person with the surname Loi on the island of Great Britain in 1881.

The 2010 United States Census found 1,357 people with the surname Loi, making it the 19,814th-most-common name in the country. This represented an increase from 985  (23,922nd-most-common) in the 2000 Census. In both censuses, slightly fewer than nine-tenths of the bearers of the surname identified as Asian, and between six and eight per cent as White. It was the 1,056th-most-common surname among respondents to the 2000 Census who identified as Asian.

People
Francesco Loi (1891–1977), Italian gymnast from Cagliari, Sardinia
Loi Ah Koon, Hainan-born founder of the Singapore-based Ya Kun Kaya Toast café chain
Duilio Loi (1929–2008), Italian boxer
Franco Loi (1930–2021), Italian poet
Bruno Loi (born 1941), Italian Army lieutenant general
Maria Antonietta Loi (born 1973), Italian physicist from Cagliari, Sardinia
Loi Wai Long (born 1989), Macau football defender
Cleo Loi (born ), Australian astrophysicist
Loi Wai Hong (born 1992), Macau football defender
Antonio Loi (born 1996), Italian football midfielder from Isili, Sardinia
Livio Loi (born 1997), Belgian motorcycle racer
Loi Im Lan (born 1998), Macau sprinter
Sherene Loi, Australian oncologist

See also
 LOI (disambiguation)
 Sardinian surnames

References

Surnames
Chinese-language surnames
Multiple Chinese surnames
Surnames of Italian origin
Vietnamese-language surnames